The Rockford Metros were an Arena football team formed by Arena Football League founder Jim Foster for the purposes of playing a "test game" in Rockford, Illinois in the spring of 1986 at the MetroCentre. The team was named after the MetroCentre itself. Players were taken from different semi-pro leagues in the area or those who just finished their final years of college football.  They defeated the Chicago Politicians, despite Rich Salzer's two
TDs, 30–18. The test was successful, as the Arena Football League began operation the next spring with four teams and operated continuously until 2008; a successor operation bought the rights to the game and its trademarks in bankruptcy proceedings and continues to play .

References

External links
AFL Official Website

Defunct Arena Football League teams
Metros